The 1923 Ole Miss Rebels football team represented the University of Mississippi during the 1923 college football season.

Schedule

References

Ole Miss
Ole Miss Rebels football seasons
Ole Miss Rebels football